The Battle of Porto Novo was fought on 1 July 1781 between forces of the Kingdom of Mysore and British East India Company in the place called Porto Novo (now known as Parangipettai) on the Indian subcontinent, during the Second Anglo-Mysore War. The British force, numbering more than 8,000 men under the command of Sir Eyre Coote defeated a force estimated at 40,000 under the command of Hyder Ali.

References

Porto Novo
Porto Novo
Porto Novo
1781 in India
Porto Novo
History of Tamil Nadu